Statistics of Swiss Super League in the 1942–43 season.

Overview
It was contested by 14 teams, and Grasshopper Club Zürich won the championship.

League standings

Results

Sources 
 Switzerland 1942–43 at RSSSF

Swiss Football League seasons
Swiss
Nationalliga